Boulaye Dia (born 16 November 1996) is a professional footballer who plays as a forward for Italian  club Salernitana, on loan from La Liga club Villarreal. Born in France, he plays for the Senegal national team.

Club career

Reims
Dia signed a professional contract with Stade de Reims on 16 July 2018 after a successful debut season with Jura Sud Foot where he scored 15 goals in 21 games. He made his professional debut with Reims in a 1–1 Ligue 1 tie with Angers on 20 October 2018.

On 25 October 2020, Dia scored a hat-trick in a 4–0 win against Montpellier, thereby becoming the first Reims player to score one in the top flight since Santiago Santamaría in 1978. The win was the club's first in the league in the 2020–21 season.

Villarreal
On 13 July 2021, Villarreal announced the signing of Dia on a five-year deal from Stade Reims. On his first official debut for Villareal which was against Chelsea in the 2021 UEFA Super Cup, he received lots of praise for his fine display.

Loan to Salernitana
On 18 August 2022, Dia moved to Serie A side Salernitana on loan for one year, with a buyout clause.

International career
Born in France, Dia is of Senegalese descent. He was called up to represent the Senegal national team on 1 October 2020. He first played for Senegal in a friendly 3–1 loss to Morocco on 9 October 2020.

Career statistics

Club

International

Scores and results list Senegal's goal tally first. Score column indicates score after each Dia goal.

Honours
Villarreal

 UEFA Super Cup runner-up: 2021

Senegal
Africa Cup of Nations: 2021

References

External links
 
 
 

1996 births
Living people
People from Oyonnax
Sportspeople from Ain
French sportspeople of Senegalese descent
Citizens of Senegal through descent
French footballers
Senegalese footballers
Association football forwards
Senegal international footballers
Ligue 1 players
Championnat National 2 players
La Liga players
Serie A players
Jura Sud Foot players
Stade de Reims players
Villarreal CF players
U.S. Salernitana 1919 players
2021 Africa Cup of Nations players
2022 FIFA World Cup players
Africa Cup of Nations-winning players
Senegalese expatriate footballers
Senegalese expatriate sportspeople in Spain
Senegalese expatriate sportspeople in Italy
Expatriate footballers in Spain
Expatriate footballers in Italy
Footballers from Auvergne-Rhône-Alpes